Lieutenant General Qasem Soleimani (Freeway 5) is a freeway in Iran connecting two cities of Tehran and Bandar Imam via Saveh, Arak, Borujerd, Khorramabad, Andimeshk and Ahvaz. This freeway is part of North-South Corridor. It starts from Azadegan Expressway and ends at Bandar Imam. It runs along Road 65, Road 56 and Road 37. The AADT of the section from Ahvaz to Bandar Imam is 15,000, of which 2,500 are Iraqi tankers.

Completed parts
 Tehran–Saveh–Salafchegan – 
 Arak Northern Bypass – 
 Khorramabad–Pol-e-Zal – Andimeshk 
 Ahvaz–Bandar Imam

Parts under construction
 Arak–Borujerd–Khorramabad

Planned parts
 Salafchegan–Arak
 Khorramabad Southern Bypass
 Andimeshk–Ahvaz

Detailed characteristics

Images

Tehran–Pardis Freeway

Detailed characteristics

References

External links
 Iran Road Maintenance & Transportation Organization
 Road management center of Iran
 Ministry of Roads & Urban Development of Iran  

5
Transportation in Khuzestan Province
Transportation in Lorestan Province
Transportation in Markazi Province
Transportation in Qom Province
Transport in Tehran
Transportation in Tehran Province
Qasem Soleimani
Transport in Arak